Dominique Bruinenberg (born 23 January 1993) is a Dutch football midfielder who plays for SC Telstar in the Eredivisie and has played for the Netherlands U-19 team.

Career

Club

SC Telstar
Bruinenberg started her career with Eredivisie side SC Telstar VVNH in 2011 where she would spend four seasons as a regular contributor in the Dutch top flight. In the time she register 91 appearances and scored 7 goals.

Den Haag
In 2015, Bruinenberg was signed to ADO Den Haag. She continued as a regular starter and helped ADO earn the club's third KNVB Women's Cup championship versus AFC Ajax. Staying just a single season with ADO, Bruinenberg made 23 appearances scoring 5 goals.

Verona
Bruinenberg made the move to Serie A in July 2016, signing with ASD Verona. She made 5 league appearances for Verona, scoring once, and made her first 2 appearances in the Champions League. In the same season, Verona would also finish as runners-up in the Italian Women's Super Cup to ACF Brescia

Sunderland
In February 2017, Bruinenberg left Italy to sign with WSL 1 side, Sunderland Ladies. 
She made all 8 starts of the Black Cat's 2017 Spring Series campaign, helping Sunderland finish 5th in the table.

During the 2017-18 season, Bruinenberg made 17 more appearances and scoring five goals for Sunderland.

Everton
In July 2018, Bruinenberg joined Everton L.F.C.

International
Bruinenberg has made appearances for the Netherlands U-19 team but has yet to appear for the senior team as of 2020.

References

External links

1993 births
Living people
Dutch women's footballers
Expatriate women's footballers in Italy
Expatriate women's footballers in England
Dutch expatriate sportspeople in England
Eredivisie (women) players
Women's Super League players
Everton F.C. (women) players
Women's association football defenders
People from Maasdonk
Dutch expatriate women's footballers
PEC Zwolle (women) players
Telstar (women's football club) players
ADO Den Haag (women) players
A.S.D. AGSM Verona F.C. players
Sunderland A.F.C. Ladies players
SC Sand players
Footballers from North Brabant
Expatriate women's footballers in Germany
Dutch expatriate sportspeople in Germany
Dutch expatriate sportspeople in Italy
Serie A (women's football) players
Frauen-Bundesliga players